Antonio Cippico (20 March 1877 – 17 January 1935) was an Italian politician, translator, and irredentist. Cippico was an Italian senator. He translated Shakespeare and Nietzsche into Italian, and the Oresteia together with Tito Marrone.

He was an Italian born in Zadar, Dalmatia, and was for many years Professor of Italian Literature at the University of London. Cippico was appointed senator by Benito Mussolini. He was also a delegate to the League of Nations Assembly. Cippico, who died in 1935, was a supporter of Italian fascism in its beginnings. Cippico was also an Italian irredentist. He wrote for the Giornale d'Italia ("The Newspaper of Italy"), publishing a series of articles about Italian interests in the Adriatic, and made fierce attacks on the so-called "neutralists", whom he scornfully called "Germanophiles". In the end of 1914 he co-founded in Rome the society Pro Dalmazia italiana ("In favor of an Italian Dalmatia").

References

1877 births
1935 deaths
Dalmatian Italians
Politicians from Zadar
Members of the Senate of the Kingdom of Italy
Italian fascists
Burials in the Protestant Cemetery, Rome